Olav Magne Dønnem (born 21 November 1980) is a Norwegian former ski jumper.

In the World Cup he finished among the top 10 on three occasions. In 1998 he won the Norwegian National Junior Championship in Lysgårdsbakkene, Lillehammer, Norway. At the 2001 FIS Nordic World Ski Championships, he came 39th in the large hill. He finished 19th at the FIS Ski Flying World Championships 2000. He won the 2003–04 Continental Cup. His personal best is fourth place in 1998 in Harrachov.

External links

1980 births
Living people
Norwegian male ski jumpers
People from Surnadal
Sportspeople from Møre og Romsdal